The Mudburra, also spelt Mudbara and other variants, are an Aboriginal Australian people of the Northern Territory.

Language

Mudburra is one of the far eastern forms of the Pama-Nyungan Ngumbin languages.

Country
Their northern reach ran as far as Top Springs, their frontier to the south lay at Cattle Creek. In an east–west axis, their land extended from near Newcastle Waters to the Camfield River.

Alternative names 
 Madbara
 Moodburra, Mootburra
 Mudbara
 Mudbera
 Mudbra
 Mudbura
 Mudburra
 Mulpira. (Iliaura exonym)

Source:

See also
Ngumpit, a name used by the Gurindji, Malngin, Bilinara, Mudburra and Ngarinyman peoples to refer to themselves as a group
Wave Hill walk-off, in which Mudbara workers joined the Gurindji strike in 1967.

Notes

Citations

Sources

Aboriginal peoples of the Northern Territory